William Findlay Weir (18 April 1889 – 9 July 1918) was a Scottish professional footballer who played as a wing half for The Wednesday and Tottenham Hotspur in the Football League.

Early life
Weir was born on 18 April 1889 in Lenzie, Dunbartonshire, the son of William and Mary Weir, his father was a dairyman. In 1901, Weir was described as an apprentice engine fitter.

Career 
A wing half, Weir began his career in Scottish junior football, before joining Maryhill in 1906. He moved to England to join First Division club The Wednesday in May 1909 and made 72 appearances, scoring one goal, before moving to fellow top-flight club Tottenham Hotspur in May 1912. Over the course of the following three seasons, Weir made 101 appearances and scored two goals before competitive football was suspended due to the outbreak of the First World War.

Personal life 
In early 1915, during the first year of the First World War, Weir enlisted as a sapper in the Royal Engineers and was posted to the Western Front in November that year. By January 1916, he had risen to the rank of sergeant and was wounded later that year. By mid-1918, Weir was based at Royal Engineers Demolition Training Depot in Newark-on-Trent. He died at 2nd Eastern General Hospital in Brighton on 9 July 1918 and was buried in Lambhill Cemetery, Glasgow.

Career statistics

References 

1889 births
1918 deaths
Scottish footballers
Footballers from Glasgow
English Football League players
Sheffield Wednesday F.C. players
Tottenham Hotspur F.C. players
Association football wing halves
British military personnel killed in World War I
Maryhill F.C. players
Scottish Junior Football Association players
British Army personnel of World War I
Royal Engineers soldiers